The Anderkoti, Koti or Kotiyan (Urdu; اندر کوٹی) are a Muslim community found in Ajmer in India, and in Pakistan.

History and origin 
The original town of Ajmer was built inside the valley, through which the road leads to Taragarh, and this place known as Anderkot, is still residence of Muslim Families, Sheikhs, Pathans, and Sayeds. They are the descendants of the soldiers who came to Ajmer in the time of Shahab-ud-din 

Businessman, Moneylenders and wealthy people hire them as bodyguard for their fearlessness. In the past When the langar is cooked it first sets apart for the foreign pilgrims, and then it is the hereditary privilege of the people of Anderkot, and of the menials of Dargah to empty the cauldron. The custom of "looting of deg" is very ancient but no accounts of its origin can be given. however now this practice has been discontinued.

Haidos or Haiydos 
In the Muharram month of Islamic calendar the Anderkotis do a ritual with their sharp swords known as "Haidos or Haydos ". People form a circle and move their sword in wild confusion on the 9th Muharram after Isha and on 10th after Zuhar Prayers .After the Partition Anderkoti people who migrated to Pakistan started this tradition in the Hyderabad, Sindh and still continued. It is mentioned as 'The Swords of play ' in Rajputana District Gazette. hundred men perform this and 100 Swords are given by Ajmer Administration.

References

External links 

 Haidos in Pakistan
 Dainik Bhaskar

Muslim communities in Asia
Muslim communities of Rajasthan
Muslim communities of India
Ajmer district
History of Ajmer
Partition of India
Dargahs in India
Islamic festivals in India
Islamic festivals in Asia
Muslim Brotherhood
Sufi saints
British India